The Youngest Profession is a 1943 film directed by Edward Buzzell, and starring Virginia Weidler, Edward Arnold, John Carroll, Scotty Beckett, and Agnes Moorehead. Based on a short story series and book written by Lillian Day, it contains cameos by Greer Garson, Lana Turner, William Powell, Walter Pidgeon, and Robert Taylor.

Plot
Lively teen Joan Lyons and her best friend, Patricia Drew, are dedicated autograph seekers who run around New York City attempting to meet celebrities. Deceived by trouble-making governess Miss Featherstone, Joan is distracted from her star-chasing by concerns over her parents' marriage. This leads Joan to hire a muscle man named Dr. Hercules to flirt with her mother, which only results in more misunderstandings.

Cast

Box office
According to MGM records, the film earned $1,187,000 in the US and Canada and $359,000 elsewhere resulting in a profit of $583,000.

References

External links
 
 
 
 

1943 films
1943 comedy films
American black-and-white films
American comedy films
1940s English-language films
Films directed by Edward Buzzell
Metro-Goldwyn-Mayer films
Films with screenplays by Charles Lederer
Films produced by B. F. Zeidman
1940s American films